Klakar is a municipality in Brod-Posavina County, Croatia. There are 2,417 inhabitants of which 99% declare themselves Croats (2001 census). According to the 2011 census, there are 2,319 inhabitants in the municipality. As of 2018, it is estimated that the municipality has 2,113 inhabitants. The municipality is made up of four settlements: Donja Bebrina (2011 census population of 425), Gornja Bebrina (2011 census population of 487), Klakar (2011 census population of 272), and Rušćica (2011 census population of 1,135).

Weather
In Klakar, the summers are warm, the winters are very cold, and it is partly cloudy year-round. Over the course of the year, the temperature typically varies from 26°F to 83°F and is rarely below 14°F or above 93°F.

References

 

Municipalities of Croatia
Populated places in Brod-Posavina County